Podotachina is a subgenus of flies in the family Tachinidae.

Species
E. cantans Mesnil, 1960
E. fuscihirta Chao & Liang, 1992
E. glossatorum (Rondani, 1859)
E. hainanensis Chao & Liang, 1992
E. ladelli (Baranov, 1936)
E. sorbillans (Wiedemann, 1830)
E. tenuicerca Liang & Chao, 1992
E. yunnanica Chao, 1964

References

Diptera of Europe
Diptera of Asia
Exoristinae
Insect subgenera